Mary Sullivan may refer to:

 Mary Sullivan (murder victim), a victim in the Boston Strangler case
 Mary Sullivan (netball) (1920–1977), New Zealand netball player
 Mary A. Sullivan (died 1950), American police detective
 Mary Ann Sullivan (born 1959), American politician (former member of the Indiana House of Representatives)
 Mary Gail Sullivan (born 1952), American former rugby union player
 Mary Quinn Sullivan (1877–1939), American art collector
 Mary Sullivan (politician), member of the Vermont House of Representatives

See also 
 Mary Kenney O'Sullivan (1864–1943), organizer in the early U.S. labor movement
 Mary Josephine Donovan O'Sullivan (1886–1966), professor of history